The Evanioidea are a small hymenopteran superfamily that includes three families, two of which (Aulacidae and Gasteruptiidae) are much more closely related to one another than they are to the remaining family, Evaniidae. The rich fossil record, however, helps fill in the gaps between these lineages. They all share the trait of having the metasoma attached very high above the hind coxae on the propodeum.

It is a poorly known group as a whole, with some 1100 known species in total, and a great many species are still undescribed. While each of the three families differs in biology, within each family, they are remarkably uniform in appearance and habits.

The oldest records of the group date to the Middle Jurassic, and were diverse from the Middle Jurassic to mid Cretaceous, however, during the mid-Cretaceous they were overtaken in diversity by the Ichneumonoidea, and since the end of the Cretaceous have a relatively scant fossil record.

References

External links
Tree of Life Evanioidea

 
Apocrita superfamilies